Y2K (also known as  Countdown to Chaos and Y2K: The Movie) is a 1999 American made-for-television science fiction-thriller film directed by Dick Lowry and starring Ken Olin and Kate Vernon. The film takes a fictional look at the societal problems that could ensue from widespread computer shutdowns caused by the Year 2000 problem, also known as the Y2K problem or the Millennium bug. The film premiered November 21, 1999 on NBC.

The film's airing sparked a controversy after some utility and banking industry trade associations, including the Edison Electric Institute, asked TV stations not to air the film. Before the film aired, executive producer David Israel called the concerns "silly." "My guess is some of the things we say are going to happen might happen, and some we say might won't," he told Variety in November 1999. "It's not like Y2K is a big secret."

The film was harshly criticized by critics and preceded by a disclaimer that stated that "This program does not suggest or imply that any of these events could actually occur."

Background
Executive producer David Israel and his partner, Patrick Caddell, developed the idea of making a Y2K disaster film in the summer of 1998. "We were sitting at my kitchen table and concocted this thing and went and pitched it," Israel told the Los Angeles Times in 1999. "Frankly, I was astonished that nobody else pitched it. When we were able to clear the title 'Y2K,' I was flabbergasted. I was surprised we are the only fictional thing that got made."

Another Y2K-themed film with the same title and starring Louis Gossett Jr., Sarah Chalke and Malcolm McDowell was produced and released straight to video in 1999.

Plot
Nick Cromwell (Olin) is an MIT-trained freelance computer systems analyst who works at a Seattle nuclear power plant. With the Y2K computer bug shutting down computer systems around the globe after midnight on January 1, 2000, Cromwell first is in Washington, D.C., arranging for an arriving airplane to land without the benefit of runway lights. Then, after word leaks a Swedish nuclear power plant has had a meltdown just a few hours earlier after that country ushered in the year 2000, Cromwell must hop a supersonic jet back home to Seattle, where Cromwell's family lives, to prevent a meltdown at the same kind of power plant. That requires the evacuation of a 10-mile radius of the plant, including Cromwell's wife, Alix (Vernon), who is a doctor delivering a millennium baby. Further complicating matters for the Cromwells is the fact that although Alix has told their two children to stay home, 16-year-old daughter, Kelly (Jane McGregor), sneaks out to party. This requires Alix to roam the city looking for her.

Other disasters around the country include power failures crippling the entire Eastern seaboard, computers unlocking all doors in a Texas prison and Jay Leno of The Tonight Show With Jay Leno continuing to broadcast.

Cast
Ken Olin as Nick Cromwell
Joe Morton as Martin Lowell
Kate Vernon as Alix Cromwell
Lauren Tom as Ann Lee
Zack Ward as Rick Rothmans
Rex Linn as Nuclear plant foreman 
Jay Leno as himself
Inday Ba 
Jane McGregor as Kelly Cromwell
Ronny Cox as Benjamin Cromwell
Michal Suchánek as Donny Cromwell
Terence Kelly as Roy Jenkins

Reception
The film was criticized by many critics. Wired wrote that the film had a "hackneyed approach to storytelling", and was "a rather pedestrian action movie", while the Washington Post'''s Tom Shales dismissed the film for being insufficient as a thriller, noting that "it never quickens the pulse or sets the senses on edge the way a thriller ought to do. It merely catalogues random catastrophes that could possibly maybe might occur at midnight when we leave the miserable 1900s behind and plunge headlong into the 2000s." ZDNet's Mitch Ratcliffe called it "indescribably silly."

Several media outlets also took aim at the film for its technical inaccuracies, including ZDNet, which highlighted more than 25 "myths" from the film, and Computerworld'', which printed a "Fact or Fiction?" rundown.

References

External links

1999 films
1999 television films
1990s science fiction thriller films
American science fiction thriller films
NBC network original films
Films scored by Brad Fiedel
Films directed by Dick Lowry
1990s English-language films
1990s American films